Livingston is a city and county seat of Park County, Montana, United States.  It is in southwestern Montana, on the Yellowstone River, north of Yellowstone National Park.  As of the 2020 census, the population of the city was 8,040.

History
The founding of the small historical railroad and ranching town of Livingston is a direct result of the Northern Pacific Railway (NPR). This site became a centralized point in the Rockies and the NPR's location for railroad shops to service their steam trains before ascending the Bozeman Pass, the line's highest point, located immediately west. Livingston also became the first gateway town to America's first national park, Yellowstone, which the NPR promoted heavily to visitors from the East. The NPR also operated a branch line running 50 miles south through Paradise Valley, first to Cinnabar station and later to Yellowstone's north entrance in Gardiner.

Clark City

Downstream the Yellowstone River, about 3 miles from present-day Livingston, an old fisherman named Amos Benson built a log cabin in 1872. This is where a ferry, a trading post and a small community called Benson's Landing was located. Across the river from Benson's Landing in June 1882 was the camp of about 40 tents of the Northern Pacific survey crew. This is where they thought the supply store site they were looking for should be. On July 14, 1882, a man who worked for the Northern Pacific named Joseph J. McBride arrived with orders to find another site to build the store. On July 16, George H. Carver, who became a major local businessman and political leader, arrived at the site of present-day Livingston. Carver and McBride became the first local residents when they pitched their tents on the 16th. Also on the 16th arrived 30 freight wagons drawn by 140 oxen, carrying 140,000 lbs. of merchandise. The supply store was to be of Bruns and Kruntz, contractors. Eventually, the tents gave way to log cabins. All of Benson's Landing encampment moved up the river to Carver and McBride's camp within 10 days of the train's arrival.

This new settlement was called "Clark City" after Heman Clark, the principal contractor for the Northern Pacific from the Missouri westward. By fall, the town was well established and a November 1882 poll counted 348 votes for delegates to congress. Clark City was on the southeast side at the East end of Lewis St. just southwest of the KPRK, and is now part of Livingston. B.F. Downen built the first permanent residence (out of wood) and Frank White owned the first saloon. Clark City eventually had 6 general stores, 2 hotels, 2 restaurants, 2 watchmakers, 2 wholesale liquor dealers, 2 meat markets, 3 blacksmiths, 1 hardware store, 30 saloons and a population of 500.

As Clark City was growing, nobody realized that the Northern Pacific had marked on its maps a town called Livingston at the same place. The railroad officially reached Clark City on November 22, 1882. In October 1882 a post office was chartered for Clark City. In November, Livingston received its charter. That was when it was decided that Livingston be located a short distance away. Then Clark City residents bought lots in Livingston and moved. The birth of Livingston was the death of Clark City. The walking distance between them was considerable and Clark City became stream-and-bog urban wildland. Very few buildings still remain.

Incorporation

On December 21, 1882, Livingston was incorporated and named in honor of Johnston Livingston, pioneer Northern Pacific Railway stockholder, director and friend of Northern Pacific Railroad President Henry Villard. Johnston Livingston was director from 1875 to 1881 and 1884–1887. Crawford Livingston Jr., Johnston's nephew, is more commonly considered the town's namesake. Crawford bought the real estate after the survey and on July 17, 1883, established the First National Bank in the city. Often he spoke of Livingston as "his town," and he apparently enjoyed the publicity of supposedly having a city named for him. But the name Livingston has always stood out in the Northern Pacific official family.

Livingston is along the Yellowstone River, where it bends from north to east toward Billings and in proximity to Interstate 90. In July 1806 Captain William Clark of the Lewis and Clark Expedition camped on the city's present outskirts on the return trip east preparing to descend the Yellowstone River. Clark's party rejoined the Lewis party at the confluence with the Missouri River, near Williston, North Dakota.

Attractions
Although small, Livingston has a number of popular tourist attractions. The Livingston Depot, built in 1902 after two predecessors, is a restored rail station that houses a railroad museum open from May to September. The Yellowstone Gateway Museum documents regional history from one of the oldest North American archaeological sites to Wild Western and Yellowstone history. The International Fly Fishing Federation's museum is an extensive introduction to a popular game sport and hosts annual enthusiast meetings. The city was inhabited for two decades by Calamity Jane and visited by a number of traveling members of European royalty.

In 1938, Dan Bailey, an eastern fly-fisherman, established Dan Bailey's Fly Shop and mail order fly tying business on Park Street. Also in Livingston is the Fly Fishing Discovery Center, a museum operated by the Federation of Fly Fishers. Actors Peter Fonda and Margot Kidder, Saturday Night Live alumnus Rich Hall, musician Ron Strykert, novelist Walter Kirn, and poet Jim Harrison have lived in the city. Jimmy Buffett mentions Livingston in multiple songs.

Its economy is flat, and like the rest of the state, the unemployment rate is below the national average. Almost 50% of its workforce commutes to Bozeman, as well as the destination resort Chico Hot Springs 25 miles south, and various campsites and ranches in Paradise Valley. Recently the city has invested in attractions and accommodation for tourists visiting during the Lewis and Clark bicentennial years.

Livingston and its immediately adjacent area has 17 sites listed on the National Register of Historic Places, enumerated within Park County's NRHP listings.

It has a sister-city relationship with Naganohara, Japan.

Geography

Livingston is located at  (45.658840, -110.563718), at an elevation of 4,501 feet (1372 m).

Climate

According to the Köppen Climate Classification system, Livingston has a warm-summer humid continental climate, abbreviated "Dfb" on climate maps.

Livingston has some of the warmest winters in the state, but the temperature can feel cold because Livingston is also one of the windiest places in the United States, having the 2nd highest average wind speed among airport/AMOS stations from 2000 to 2010.

Demographics

2010 census
As of the census of 2010, there were 7,044 people, 3,356 households, and 1,744 families living in the city. The racial makeup of the city was 96.2% White, 0.1% African American, 0.8% Native American, 0.3% Asian, 0.6% from other races, and 2.0% from two or more races. Hispanic or Latino of any race were 2.5% of the population.

There were 3,356 households, of which 24.7% had children under the age of 18 living with them, 39.2% were married couples living together, 9.1% had a female householder with no husband present, 3.7% had a male householder with no wife present, and 48.0% were non-families. 40.4% of all households were made up of individuals, and 14.3% had someone living alone who was 65 years of age or older. The average household size was 2.07 and the average family size was 2.81.

The median age in the city was 41.1 years. 21% of residents were under the age of 18; 5.6% were between the ages of 18 and 24; 28.3% were from 25 to 44; 28.9% were from 45 to 64; and 16.2% were 65 years of age or older. The gender makeup of the city was 48.5% male and 51.5% female.

2000 census
At the 2000 census, there were 6,851 people, 3,084 households and 1,751 families living in the city. The population density was 2,601.3 per square mile (1,005.8/km). There were 3,360 housing units at an average density of 1,275.8 per square mile (493.3/km). The racial makeup of the city was 96.39% White, 0.31% African American, 0.98% Native American, 0.50% Asian, 0.60% from other races, and 1.23% from two or more races. Hispanic or Latino of any race were 2.16% of the population.

There were 3,084 households, of which 26.7% had children under the age of 18 living with them, 43.8% were married couples living together, 9.1% had a female householder with no husband present, and 43.2% were non-families. 37.5% of all households were made up of individuals, and 15.6% had someone living alone who was 65 years of age or older. The average household size was 2.16 and the average family size was 2.86.

Age distribution was 22.7% under the age of 18, 7.5% from 18 to 24, 27.5% from 25 to 44, 23.6% from 45 to 64, and 18.6% who were 65 years of age or older. The median age was 40 years. For every 100 females, there were 95.0 males. For every 100 females age 18 and over, there were 90.7 males.

The median household income was $28,980, and the median family income was $40,505. Males had a median income of $26,619 versus $18,684 for females. The per capita income for the city was $16,636. About 5.6% of families and 12.1% of the population were below the poverty line, including 15.0% of those under age 18 and 10.4% of those age 65 or over.

Economy
Historically a railroad city until the mid-1980s, the city today depends significantly on tourism.  The Federation of Fly Fishers is based in Livingston.

According to Livingston's 2011 Comprehensive Annual Financial Report, the top private employers in Park County (the city's website refers to approximately a hundred public employees) are:

Education
Livingston Public Schools educates students from kindergarten through 12th grade. Park High School's team name is the Rangers.

Livingston has a public library, the Livingston-Park County Public Library.

Infrastructure
Mission Field is a public use airport located five miles east of town.

Media

Newspapers
Livingston Enterprise is a local daily newspaper.  The monthly Montana Pioneer and bimonthly Atlantis Rising are also Livingston-based.

AM radio
 KBOZ 1090, (Talk/personality), Reier Broadcasting Company
 KOBB 1230, (Sports talk), Reier Broadcasting Company
 KPRK AM 1340, (Talk), GapWest Broadcasting
 KMMS 1450, ( News/talk), GapWest Broadcasting

FM radio
 KLEU 91.1, (Christian music/talk programming), Hi-Line Radio Fellowship
 KGLT 91.9, (Variety), Montana State University-Bozeman
 KOBB-FM 93.7, (Oldies), Reier Broadcasting Company
 KMMS-FM 94.7, (Adult album), GapWest Broadcasting
 KISN 96.7, (Top 40 (CHR)), GapWest Broadcasting
 KOZB 97.5, (Classic rock), Reier Broadcasting Company
 KBOZ-FM 99.9, (Country music), Reier Broadcasting Company
 KXLB 100.7, (Country music), GapWest Broadcasting
 KBMC (FM) 102.1, (Variety), Montana State University-Billings
 KZMY 103.5, (Hot adult contemporary), GapWest Broadcasting
 KBZM 104.7, (Classic hits), Orion Media
 KSCY 106.9, (Country music), Orion Media

Television

Bozeman Market
 KTVM 6 NBC, Bonten Media Group
 KBZK 7 CBS, Evening Post Publishing Company
 KUSM 9 PBS, Montana State University

Billings Market
 KULR 8 NBC, Cowles Montana Media
 KTVQ-TV 2 CBS, Evening Post Publishing Company

Filmography
The city of Livingston has been a staging area or location for a number of films, including:

 Rancho Deluxe, 1975
 Amazing Grace and Chuck, 1987
 A River Runs Through It, 1992
 The Horse Whisperer, 1998
 Cowboys vs. Dinosaurs, 2015
 Certain Women, 2016
 Walking Out, 2017
 Wildlife (film), 2018

Set in Livingston
 Yellowstone (American TV series), 2018 continuing

Notable people

 Dan Bailey, renowned fly tyer and owner of Dan Bailey's Fly Shop
 Arthur Blank, owner of Paradise Valley Pop Stand and Grill and Mountain Sky Guest Ranch
 Ed Bouchee, major league baseball first baseman
 Tom Brokaw, television journalist
 Tim Cahill, travel writer
 Calamity Jane, cavalry scout, western heroine
 Russell Chatham, landscape artist
 Michael Dahlquist, drummer for the band Silkworm
 Al Feldstein, comic artist and painter
 Mayhew Foster, World War II pilot who transported Hermann Göring
Chad Franscoviak, sound engineer
 Cassidy Freeman, actress
 Eduardo Garcia, chef and businessman
 Charles Garnier Sr., Founder, Garnier Cigar Company Est. 1886, 6-term mayor of Livingston elected 1901
 Thomas Goltz, journalist and author
 Rich Hall, comedian, writer and musician
 Jim Harrison, poet and author (Legends of the Fall)
 Torey Hayden, psychologist and author
William Hjortsberg, author & screenwriter (Falling Angel, Legend (1985 film)
 Margot Kidder, actress
 Walter Kirn, novelist
 Thomas Leforge, mid-19th century liaison to and resident among the Crow Tribe
 Pete Lovely, race car driver
John Mayer, musician
Thomas McGuane, writer, novelist, film director, screenwriter
P.W. Nelson, lawman, town marshal, first police chief of Livingston
 Ken Niles, radio announcer and actor (Out of the Past)
 Wendell Niles, radio announcer, actor
 James F. O'Connor, United States Representative from Montana
 Christopher Paolini, author of the Inheritance Cycle
 Doug Peacock, author, grizzly bear expert.
 Sam Peckinpah, film director; resided at the Murray Hotel from 1979 to 1984
 Lester Thurow, economist, author and Rhodes Scholar

References

External links

 City of Livingston
 Livingston Chamber of Commerce - Information about the Livingston area
 The Livingston Enterprise - Daily newspaper
 The Livingston Current - Weekly newspaper
 The Montana Pioneer  - Monthly newspaper
 Arts Montana  - Community cultural links and arts events

Cities in Park County, Montana
County seats in Montana
Populated places established in 1882
1882 establishments in Montana Territory
Railway towns in Montana
Cities in Montana